Steven Grayson Smith (born 3 August 1946), is a former United States Navy Rear Admiral. He ended his military career in January 2003 after 34 years.
Smith received the Defense Distinguished Service Medal, Navy Distinguished Service Medal, two Defense Superior Service Medals, four awards of the Legion of Merit and two Bronze Star Medals with Combat "V".

References

1946 births
Living people
People from Brielle, New Jersey
Valley Forge Military Academy and College alumni
McCombs School of Business alumni
Naval War College alumni
United States Navy admirals
Recipients of the Legion of Merit
Recipients of the Defense Superior Service Medal
Recipients of the Navy Distinguished Service Medal
Recipients of the Defense Distinguished Service Medal
American chief operating officers
Military personnel from New Jersey